Héctor Pablo Ramírez Puga (born 30 November 1967) is a Mexican politician affiliated with the Institutional Revolutionary Party. As of 2014 he served as Deputy of the LIX and LXI Legislatures of the Mexican Congress representing Oaxaca.

Since 2012 he has been director of Liconsa, a state-owned company which serves as milk supply nationwide.

References

1967 births
Living people
People from Oaxaca City
Institutional Revolutionary Party politicians
21st-century Mexican politicians
Politicians from Oaxaca
Universidad de las Américas Puebla alumni
Members of the Chamber of Deputies (Mexico) for Oaxaca
Deputies of the LIX Legislature of Mexico
Deputies of the LXI Legislature of Mexico